Metropolitan Sawa, (sometimes Sabbas, secular birth name Michał Hrycuniak; born 14 April 1938 in Śniatycze) is the Archbishop of Warsaw and Metropolitan of All Poland, and hence the Primate of the Polish Orthodox Church since 1998, the second largest organized religion in Poland. Sawa was a longtime associate of communist Służba Bezpieczeństwa actively working under name of TW Jurek during which he cooperated with communist authorities, leading a coordinated campaign both again individual church members and the Orthodox church itself. He supported and worked with communist government for the purpose of advancing his career within the Church.   He is also a professor of theology. Previously, he was a bishop of Białystok and Gdańsk (1981–1998) and Łódź and Poznań (1979–1981).

References 

1938 births
Living people
People from Zamość County
Ministry of Public Security (Poland) officials
Bishops of the Polish Orthodox Church
Eastern Orthodox Christians from Poland
Recipients of the Order of Prince Yaroslav the Wise, 1st class
Eastern Orthodox bishops in Europe